Sverre Bergh Johansen (16 October 1939 – 12 March 2017) was a Norwegian diplomat and ambassador.

He iwas a cand.jur. and mag.art. (PhD equivalent) by education, and started working for the Norwegian Ministry of Foreign Affairs in 1967. He was a sub-director in the Norwegian Office of the Prime Minister from 1991 to 1994, served as the Norwegian ambassador to the People's Republic of China from 1994 to 1999, and to the United Nations in Geneva from 2001 to 2005.

References

1939 births
2017 deaths
Norwegian civil servants
Ambassadors of Norway to China
Permanent Representatives of Norway to the United Nations
Norwegian expatriates in Switzerland